Kumkuma Rakshe is a 1977 Kannada-language drama film directed by S. K. A. Chari. It is a remake of the 1962 Tamil film Nenjil Or Aalayam by C. V. Sridhar. The film stars Ashok, Rajinikanth, and Manjula.

Cast

Manjula 
Ashok 
Rajinikanth
Leelavathi

Soundtrack 
The soundtrack of the film was composed by Vijaya Bhaskar.

References

External links 
 

1970s Kannada-language films
1977 films
Films set in hospitals
Kannada remakes of Tamil films
Films scored by Vijaya Bhaskar
Indian romantic drama films
1977 romantic drama films